China–Gabon relations refer to the foreign relations between China and Gabon. On December 9, 1960, China (as the Republic of China in Taipei) established diplomatic relations with Gabon. Gabon has switched recognition to the People's Republic of China in Beijing on April 20, 1974.

Gabon adheres to the One China policy where it recognizes the PRC as the sole legitimate government of China and does not recognize the legitimacy of the ROC.

Chinese development finance to Gabon
From 2000 to 2011, there are approximately 25 Chinese official development finance projects identified in Gabon through various media reports. These projects range from extending a concessionary loan of $83.1 million to fund the Grand Poubara Dam in 2008, to the construction of the Stade de l’Amitié, also known as the ‘friendship stadium'.

Human rights
In June 2020, Gabon was one of 53 countries backed the Hong Kong national security law at the United Nations.

References

 
Gabon
Bilateral relations of Gabon